Ganapathi credited as Ganeshkar is a Tamil comedian actor who prominently plays supporting roles. Appearing in many Tamil films (Kollywood), he is also a host for Super 10 on Sun TV in Chennai. 
He took part in Kalaignar TV's dance show, Maanada Mayilada, with Aarthi whom he married. They won 500,000 Indian Rupees as a 2nd prize.

Partial filmography

Karimedu Karuvayan (1986)
Manadhil Urudhi Vendum (1987)
Pudhu Pudhu Arthangal (1989)
Siva (1989)
En Thangai Kalyani (1989)
Nee Pathi Naan Pathi (1991)
Thaiyalkaran (1991)
Sundara Kandam (1992)
Moondravadhu Kann (1993)
Parvathi Ennai Paradi (1993)
Thottil Kuzhandhai (1995)
Avathara Purushan (1996)
Musthaffaa (1996)
Koodi Vazhnthal Kodi Nanmai (2000)
Kovil (2004)
Selvam (2005)
Pori (2007)
Pandhayam (2008)
Nepali (2008)
Nenjathai Killadhe (2008)
Padikkathavan (2009)
Pinju Manasu (2009)
Mambattiyan (2011)
Kazhugu (2012)
Karuppampatti (2013)
Kanna Laddu Thinna Aasaiya (2013)
Arya Surya (2013)
Idhu Kathirvelan Kadhal (2014)
Aranmanai (2014)
Dhilluku Dhuddu (2016)
Hello Naan Pei Pesuren (2016)
Mohini (2018)
Chithiram Pesuthadi 2 (2019)
Call Taxi (2021)
Pei Mama (2021)

Television
 Meendum Meendum Sirippu
 Super 10
 Padavarisai 10
 Maanada Mayilada
 Kasalavu Nesam
 Sirippulogam
 Bommalattam
 Star Wars
Anbe Vaa
Abhiyum Naanum

References

External links
 

Living people
Tamil male actors
Tamil comedians
Tamil male television actors
Tamil television presenters
Television personalities from Tamil Nadu
Male actors from Chennai
Indian male comedians
Male actors in Tamil cinema
21st-century Tamil male actors
Tamil Reality dancing competition contestants
20th-century Indian male actors
Indian male film actors
Indian male television actors
1978 births